Thomas John Miller (11 March 1875 – 1949) was an English footballer, who played for Wolverhampton Wanderers and Stoke.

Career
Miller started with Hednesford Town before joining League side Wolverhampton Wanderers in 1896. He soon became a regular at left wing for Wolves as they side enjoyed a good spell in the late 1890s finishing in the top ten in three seasons running. The early 1900s saw Wolves finish in mid-table quite often and in 1905 Miller ended his 10-year spell at the club by agreeing to join Staffordshire rivals Stoke. In total Miller had played 269 times for Wolves scoring 49 goals. At Stoke he played 38 times in 1905–06 scoring five goals and made 25 appearances in 1906–07 but Stoke finished bottom of the First Division and were relegated. Miller's contract was not renewed and he decided to join Willenhall.

Career statistics
Source:

References

1875 births
1949 deaths
People from Hednesford
English footballers
Association football outside forwards
Hednesford Town F.C. players
Wolverhampton Wanderers F.C. players
Stoke City F.C. players
Willenhall F.C. players
English Football League players
English Football League representative players